The Malaya Kokshaga (Izi Kakšan; , literally Little Kokshaga) is a river in Mari El, a left tributary of the Volga. It originates in the northern part of the republic, passes through its capital, Yoshkar-Ola, and flows to the Kuybyshev Reservoir, Volga near Kokshaysk. The Malaya Kokshaga is mainly fed by snow. From November till April, the river is frozen. The riverbed is meandering; there are many former river beds in the valley. The main tributary is the Maly Kundysh.

See also
 Bolshaya Kokshaga

References 

Rivers of Mari El